The Battle of Newtownmountkennedy was a battle fought on 30 May 1798, between forces of the British Crown and a force of Native Irish Rebels, during the Irish Rebellion of 1798. Approximately 170 Irish rebel forces were killed out of 1000, followed by an execution of the Rebels’ leader, Michael Neil.

Sources

Musgrave, Richard. Memoirs of the Different Rebellions in Ireland. Third edition. Dublin, 1802.

Battles of the Irish Rebellion of 1798
History of County Wicklow